Mamas and Papas/Soul Train is the second album by Classics IV, released in 1968 on Imperial Records. The album was reissued in 1984 by Liberty Records, with "The Girl from Ipanema" omitted from it.

The album scratched the Billboard Top LPs, peaking at No. 196. "Stormy" was a Top 5 hit on the Billboard Hot 100.

Reception
The album was met with mixed reviews. Joe Viglione of AllMusic describes the album as a compilation of pop and soul acts, in which the band attempted to sound like the Mamas and the Papas. Bad Cat calls the album inconsistent, but praised the group for bringing an entertaining mix of commercial pop and blue-eyed soul.

Track listing
All songs are written by Buddy Buie and J. R. Cobb, except where noted.

Personnel
Production
Producer: Bill Lowery
Photography: Marvin Lyons

Charts
Album

Singles

References

External links

1968 albums
Imperial Records albums
Classics IV albums